Udea derasa is a moth in the family Crambidae. It was described by Eugene G. Munroe in 1966. It is found in North America, where it has been recorded from British Columbia and Utah.

References

Moths described in 1966
derasa